In the aviation industry, a flight number or flight designator is a code for an airline service consisting of two-character airline designator and a 1 to 4 digit number. For example, "BA 98" is a British Airways service from Toronto-Pearson to London-Heathrow. A service is called "direct" if it is covered by a single flight number, regardless of the number of stops or equipment changes. For example, "WN 417" flies from Jacksonville to Baltimore to Oakland to Los Angeles on Southwest Airlines. A given flight segment may have multiple flight numbers on different airlines under a code-sharing agreement. Strictly speaking, the flight number is just the numerical part, but it is commonly used for the entire flight designator.

The flight designator of the operating carrier of a commercial flight is used as a call sign. This is distinct from the aircraft's registration number, which identifies a specific airplane.

Conventions
A number of conventions have been developed for defining flight numbers, although these vary widely from airline to airline, and are increasingly being modified. Eastbound and northbound flights are traditionally assigned even numbers, while westbound and southbound flights have odd numbers. Other airlines will use an odd number for an outbound flight and use the next even number for the reverse inbound flight.  For destinations served by multiple flights per day, numbers tend to increase during the day.  Hence, a flight from point A to point B might be flight 101 and the return flight from B to A would be 102, while the next pair of flights on the same route would usually be assigned codes 103 and 104.

Flight numbers of less than three digits are often assigned to long-haul or otherwise premium flights. For example, flight number 1 is often used for an airline's "flagship" service (see below for a 'List of flight number 1 by airlines'). However, for airlines in Mainland China, one-digit and two-digit numbers are only reserved for administrative charters. Furthermore, Cathay Pacific assigns flight numbers which are less than 100 for cargo flights.

Four-digit numbers in the range 3000 to 5999 typically represent regional affiliate flights, while numbers larger than 6000 are generally codeshare numbers for flights operated by different airlines or even railways.

Likewise, flight numbers larger than 9000 usually refer to ferry flights; these carry no passengers and are used to relocate aircraft to or from a maintenance base, or from one air travel market to another in order to start new commercial flights. Flight numbers starting with 8 are often used for charter flights, but it always depends on the commercial carrier's choice.

Codeshare

In a codeshare, airlines share their aircraft with others, resulting in the flight having more than one flight number on the same sector, and either the same or different flight numbers on joined sectors.

As a hypothetical example, flight QQ1234 may fly from airport AAA to BBB to CCC. The AAA-BBB segment may be serviced by airline QQ, and the BBB-CCC segment by airline RR, on a different aircraft. The same flight may also be sold as RR3210, and by a third airline SS as SS2345. Also, the individual flight legs may have multiple flight numbers: AAA-BBB may be QQ12, RR23, and SS45.

For example, Alaska Airlines flight AS61  flies from Juneau (JNU) to Yakutat (YAK) to Cordova (CDV) to Anchorage (ANC). A ticket for the Yakutat to Anchorage segment is specified as AS61 YAK-ANC. It is even possible for a given flight number to cover a sequence beginning and ending at the same airport.

List of flight number 1 by airline 
Most flights are non-stop from A to B, and few are from A to B then to C (both A-B and B-C have flight number 1). Aircraft type may change due to operation need.

A notable former flight number 1 was British Airways flight BA1, operated by the Concorde between London Heathrow and New York's John F. Kennedy airport. After the retirement of Concorde in 2003 the flight number was retired with it, however in 2009 it was given to the all business class A318 flight between London City Airport and New York JFK via Shannon in Ireland. This route ceased operation in 2020 due to the COVID-19 pandemic, and British Airways has since announced it will not be restarting the service.

Flight number changes
Flight numbers are often taken out of use after a crash or a serious incident. For example, following the crash of Malaysia Airlines Flight 370, the airline changed the flight number for subsequent flights following the same route to MAH 318. Also, American Airlines Flight 77, which regularly flew from Dulles International Airport in Washington, DC, to Los Angeles International Airport, was changed to Flight 149 after it crashed into the Pentagon during the September 11 attacks. After the crash of Air France Flight 447, a regular scheduled flight from Rio de Janeiro to Paris, was changed to Air France Flight 443. On the other hand, other considerations may lead an airline not to change a flight number; for instance, the aforementioned "flagship" American Airlines Flight 1 retains its designation despite a major accident in 1962 and two other accidents in 1941 and 1936. There are at least four instances of the same flight numbers that have suffered two serious accidents: Flight 253 of Linea Aeropostal Venezolana (both in 1956, the first in June, and the second in November), Flight 869 of United Arab Airlines (the first in 1962 and the second in 1963), Flight 800 of TWA (the first in 1964 and the second in 1996), and  Flight 383 of American Airlines (the first in 1965 and the second in 2016). As of October 2019 the most recent flight number change due to an accident was from Aeroflot Flight 1492 to Aeroflot Flight 1316. In 2016 after the crash of flight 804, Egyptair changed it to 802 from Paris to Cairo. In 1998, after the crash of flight 111, Swissair changed it to 139 from New York To Geneva. In 1997, after the crash of flight 801 from Seoul to Guam, Korean Airlines changed it to number 805.

Flight number conservation
Airline mega mergers, in markets such as the United States, have made it necessary to break conventional flight numbering schemes. Organizations such as IATA, ICAO, ARC, as well as CRS systems and the FAA's ATC systems limit flight numbers to four digits (0001 to 9999). The pool of available flight numbers has been outstripped by demand for them by emergent mega-carriers. As such, some carriers use the same flight number for back-and-forth flights (e.g., DCA-PBI-DCA), or in other cases carriers have assigned a single flight number to a multi-leg flight (e.g., ICT-DAL-HOU-MDW-OMA-DEN-ABQ-LAS-BDL).

Flight designator
Although 'flight number' is the term used colloquially, the official term as defined in the Standard Schedules Information Manual (SSIM) published annually by the International Air Transport Association (IATA) Schedules Information Standards Committee (SISC), is flight designator. Officially the term 'flight number' refers to the numeric part (up to four digits) of a flight code. For example, in the flight codes BA2490 and BA2491A, "2490" and "2491" are flight numbers. Even within the airline and airport industry, it is common to use the colloquial term rather than the official term.

Spacecraft
Flight numbers are also sometimes used for spacecraft, though a flight number for an expendable rocket (say, Ariane 5 Flight 501) might more reasonably be called the serial number of the vehicle used, since an expendable rocket can only be launched once.  Space Shuttle missions used numbers with the STS prefix, for example, STS-93. SpaceX uses sequential numbers for flights of reused boosters. As an example, Crew-2 used booster B1061.2 (the second flight of booster B1061).

See also 
 Airline call sign
 Codeshare agreement
 Change of gauge (aviation)

References

Civil aviation
Identifiers